Uraias or Uraïas was an Ostrogothic general during the Gothic–Roman War of 535–540.

Uraias was a nephew of King Witiges. Although probably of humble origins, he rose through the military ranks to become a dux (duke). The Roman historian Procopius calls him an archon (ruler), which in his vocabulary means "military commander".

In 538, the Romans landed forces at Genoa and retook Milan at the request of its population. Uraias was tasked with recovering it. He besieged the city over the winter of 538–39. When the city capitulated, he allowed his Burgundian allies to seize the women for slaves and his own men to slaughter the male inhabitants because they had requested Roman assistance.

A strong Roman force remained at Dertona after the loss of Milan, preventing Uraias from relieving the besieged garrison of Fiesole in the summer of 539. After the fall of Fiesole, Witiges ordered Uraias to relieve the garrison at Osimo, but he was again unable to leave because of a Frankish invasion. By the end of 539, he had expelled the Romans from Liguria and recovered it for the Ostrogothic Kingdom, which was on the verge of collapse.

He was the most powerful and successful commander on the Ostrogothic side in early 540, but he was unable to relieve Ravenna, the capital, which his uncle was defending, because his army had suffered severe desertions in the Cottian Alps, including that of one of his subordinate commanders, Sisigis. When Witiges surrendered Ravenna to the Romans in May 540, Uraias was in command in Pavia. He was offered the kingship, but declined it. According to Procopius, he claimed on the basis of Witiges' ignominious end that his family lacked "fortune" (tyche). He instead suggested Ildibad as king. Ildibad was a nephew of Theudis, king of the Visigoths, and Uraias expected that the latter would come to the aid of his nephew. In fact, Theudis remained neutral throughout the war.

Shortly after acceding to the throne, Ildibad's wife convinced her husband that Uraias was plotting with the Romans to overthrow him. According to Procopius, the wife of Uraias wore more expensive clothes than the queen and refused to acknowledge her presence in the public baths one day. This was reported to the king as suspicious behaviour and Ildibad ordered Uraias' murder.

Uraias' unusual name has led to some speculation. He may be named after Uriah, the prophet of Jeremiah 26, whose name is spelled Urias in some versions (Oureias in the Septuagint). On the other hand, the continuator of the chronicle of Marcellinus gives his name as Oraio or Orai, which has been taken for Germanic.

Notes

Sources

Year of birth unknown
540s deaths
People of the Gothic War (535–554)
6th-century Ostrogothic people
Gothic warriors
Assassinated Gothic people